Grandview is a city in Jackson County, Missouri, United States. The population was 24,475 at the 2010 census. It is part of the Kansas City metropolitan area.

History
A post office called Grandview has been in operation since 1889. The city was named for the view obtained from the elevated town site.

Geography
Grandview is located at  (38.885007, -94.522578), along U.S. Route 71, bordering Kansas City to the south.

Demographics

The library in Grandview is part of the Mid-Continent Public Library system.

2010 census
As of the census of 2010, there were 24,475 people, 9,640 households, and 6,137 families living in the city. The racial makeup of the city was 48.4% White (45.0% non-Hispanic white), 40.8% African American, 0.5% Native American, 1.1% Asian, 0.1% Pacific Islander, 5.1% from other races, and 4.0% from two or more races. Hispanic or Latino of any race were 9.7% of the population.

There were 9,640 households, of which 34.9% had children under the age of 18 living with them, 38.6% were married couples living together, 19.2% had a female householder with no husband present, 5.9% had a male householder with no wife present, and 36.3% were non-families. 29.8% of all households were made up of individuals, and 8.2% had someone living alone who was 65 years of age or older. The average household size was 2.52 and the average family size was 3.12.

The median age in the city was 33.7 years. 26.2% of residents were under the age of 18; 10.2% were between the ages of 18 and 24; 27.7% were from 25 to 44; 24.7% were from 45 to 64; and 11.2% were 65 years of age or older. The gender makeup of the city was 47.6% male and 52.4% female.

2000 census
As of the census of 2000, there were 24,881 people, 9,709 households, and 6,485 families living in the city. The racial makeup of the city was 59.81% White, 33.54% African American, 0.56% Native American, 1.05% Asian, 0.10% Pacific Islander, 1.93% from other races, and 3.00% from two or more races. Hispanic or Latino of any race were 4.33% of the population.

There were 9,709 households, out of which 33.3% had children under the age of 18 living with them, 46.3% were married couples living together, 15.9% had a female householder with no husband present, and 33.2% were non-families. 27.5% of all households were made up of individuals, and 7.1% had someone living alone who was 65 years of age or older. The average household size was 2.53 and the average family size was 3.08.

In the city, the population was spread out, with 27.2% under the age of 18, 10.0% from 18 to 24, 31.1% from 25 to 44, 22.0% from 45 to 64, and 9.7% who were 65 years of age or older. The median age was 34 years. For every 100 females, there were 93.1 males. For every 100 females age 18 and over, there were 89.7 males.

The median income for a household in the city was $40,003, and the median income for a family was $47,889. Males had a median income of $32,481 versus $26,834 for females. The per capita income for the city was $19,079. About 5.1% of families and 8.4% of the population were below the poverty line, including 11.4% of those under age 18 and 2.4% of those age 65 or over.

Economy

Top employers
According to the town's 2016 Comprehensive Annual Financial Report, the top employers in the city are:

Education
Grandview C-4 School District operates six elementary schools, one middle school, Grandview Alternative School and Grandview Sr. High School.

Grandview has a public library, a branch of the Mid-Continent Public Library.

Notable people

 Alec Burks, 2011 1st round pick of the Utah Jazz, attended Grandview High School.
 Josh Freeman, Quarterback for the Indianapolis Colts
 Harry S. Truman, President of the United States, lived in Grandview for part of his early years.
 Martha Ellen Young Truman, mother of President Harry S. Truman.
 Xavier Williams, Defensive tackle for the Kansas City Chiefs attended and graduated from Grandview High School.

References

External links
 Grandview, Missouri website

Cities in Kansas City metropolitan area
Cities in Jackson County, Missouri
Cities in Missouri